

Adelaide 36ers

Cairns Taipans

Gold Coast Blaze

Melbourne Tigers

New Zealand Breakers

Perth Wildcats

Townsville Crocodiles

Wollongong Hawks

squads